Allan Charles Hookings (6 September 1913 – 31 October 1962) was a farmer and politician in the State of South Australia.

Allan was born in Riverton, the only son of Thomas Charles Hookings and Ivy Doris Hookings (née Pickering) (ca.1890 – 25 October 1928) of "Oaklands" sheep stud, Tarlee, later of Winchester Street, Malvern. On 26 February 1930 Thomas Hookings married again, to Alice Babidge (ca.1865 – 8 January 1944). By 1930 they had moved to a farm at Tantanoola. Allan continued farming in the Tantanoola area.

He was elected for the Liberal and Country League to a Southern district seat in the Legislative Council in February 1959, and died in office.  He was succeeded by Ren DeGaris.

References 

Australian farmers
Members of the South Australian Legislative Council
Place of death missing
1913 births
1963 deaths
Liberal and Country League politicians
People from Riverton, South Australia
20th-century Australian politicians